Chesnais is a French surname. Notable people with the surname include: 

François Chesnais, French economist and scholar
Loïg Chesnais-Girard (born 1977), French politician
Patrick Chesnais (born 1947), French actor, director, and screenwriter

French-language surnames